USS Cardinal may refer to:

, was a  that served between World War I and World War II.
, was built as the civilian fishing boat Jeanne D'Arc, then acquired and used by the Navy as a minesweeper during World War II.
 The construction of Cardinal (AM-393) was canceled in November 1945 before launching.
, was first commissioned as YMS-179, a  during World War II. Cardinal (AMS-4) was one of her several names and designations during her career.
Cardinal was transferred to Egypt in January 2007.

United States Navy ship names